Pralong Sawandee (born June 4, 1987) is a Thai professional footballer who plays as a left back.

References

External links
 

1987 births
Living people
Pralong Sawandee
Pralong Sawandee
Association football defenders
Pralong Sawandee
Pralong Sawandee
Pralong Sawandee
Pralong Sawandee